Ratta Kulachi is a town and union council of Dera Ismail Khan District in Khyber Pakhtunkhwa province of Pakistan.

References

Union councils of Dera Ismail Khan District
Populated places in Dera Ismail Khan District